The 1990–91 Copa México is the 63rd staging of the Copa México, the 36th staging in the professional era.

The competition started on August 22, 1990, and concluded on January 23, 1991, with the final, in which U. de G. lifted the trophy for first time ever with a 1–0 victory over América.

This edition was played by 20 teams, first with a group stage and later a knock-out stage.

Group stage
Group 1

Results

Group 2

Results

Group 3

Results

Group 4

Results

Final stage

Semifinals

First leg

Second leg

U. de G. advanced to final aggregate 4-1

Club América advanced to final aggregate 6-1

Final

First leg

Second leg

U. de G. Won the cup aggregate 3-2

References
Mexico - Statistics of Copa México for the 1990–91 season. (RSSSF)

Copa MX
Cop
1990–91 domestic association football cups